Yinping may refer to:

 Yinping, Chaohu (银屏镇), town in Anhui, China
 Yinping, Zaozhuang (阴平镇), town in Yicheng District, Zaozhuang, Shandong, China